Bastard rocket is a common name for several plants and may refer to:

Brassica pseudoerucastrum
Diplotaxis muralis, native to Europe, Asia, and Africa
Reseda
Sinapis arvensis, native to north Africa, Asia, and Europe